1981 in Korea may refer to:
1981 in North Korea
1981 in South Korea